Hymenocallis duvalensis (Dixie spiderlily) is a plant species in the genus Hymenocallis, family Amaryllidaceae. It is a bulb-forming herb with showy white flowers, native to floodplains and streambanks in Florida and Georgia.

Taxonomy
The species was first named in 1967 by Hamilton Paul Traub. The name was invalid according to Article 8.1 of the then International Code of Botanical Nomenclature, since Traub listed two specimens as the holotype. The name was validated by Joseph E. Laferrière in 1996.

References

External links
International Bulb Society
Gardening in the Coastal Southeast, The Genus Hymenocallis, Family Amaryllidaceae
Fezzgator Deviant Art, Hymenocallis duvalensis, Whitesands-Spiderlily

duvalensis
Flora of Florida
Flora of Georgia (U.S. state)
Plants described in 1967